Juan Pablo Valdivieso (born February 27, 1981) is a Peruvian former swimmer, who specialized in butterfly events. Valdivieso holds a dual citizenship between his parents' nation Peru and the United States, where he currently resides. He is also influenced by his grandfather Juan Valdivieso, who played for Peru's soccer team at the 1936 Summer Olympics in Berlin.

Valdivieso started swimming for the Carderock Swim Team at the age of five. During his teenage years, he tried out for the South American Junior Championships, before competing at the U.S. senior nationals. In 1999, he graduated from Landon School in Bethesda, Maryland, and deferred his acceptance to Princeton University for a year, so that he could train for his first Olympics.

Valdivieso made his first Peruvian team at the 2000 Summer Olympics in Sydney. Swimming in heat two of the men's 200 m butterfly, he edged out Thailand's Dulyarit Phuangthong to earn a fourth spot and thirty-sixth overall by 0.48 of a second in 2:03.67.

At the 2004 Summer Olympics in Athens, Valdivieso extended his program, competing in two individual events. He achieved a FINA A-cut of 2:00.03 (200 m butterfly) from the USA National Championships in College Park, Maryland. In the 200 m butterfly, he challenged seven other swimmers in heat four, including top medal favorite Takashi Yamamoto of Japan. He rounded out the field to last place and twenty-eighth overall by 0.90 of a second behind Hungary's Dávid Kolozár in 2:02.79. In the 100 m butterfly, Valdivieso placed forty-seventh on the morning's preliminaries. Swimming in heat three, he saved a seventh spot over Algeria's Aghiles Slimani by 0.24 of a second with a time of 55.98.

Between his two Olympic stints, Valdivieso attended Princeton University in New Jersey, where he majored in political economy and became a captain of the swimming team for the Princeton Tigers.

References

1981 births
Living people
Citizens of Peru through descent
Peruvian male butterfly swimmers
Pan American Games competitors for Peru
Olympic swimmers of Peru
Swimmers at the 1999 Pan American Games
Swimmers at the 2000 Summer Olympics
Swimmers at the 2003 Pan American Games
Swimmers at the 2004 Summer Olympics
American sportspeople of Peruvian descent
Swimmers from Washington, D.C.
Princeton Tigers men's swimmers